Pseudoceros monostichos  is a marine flatworm species that belongs to the Pseudocerotidae family.

Common name 
Fine-lined flatworm.

Distribution 
Tropical Indo-Pacific, from the Archipelago of Maldives to  Australia.

Habitat 
External slope or top from coral reef.

Size 

Physical characteristics 
"External anatomy: Body tapered posteriorly with a dorsal surface of an unusual dimpled texture. Cream background with a narrow black-brown longitudinal median line which doesn’t reach the anterior and posterior margins. This line is bordered by a white narrow band and surrounded by a light brown narrow band. There are four indistinct marginal bands; the inner one is yellow intensifying to green, then blue and a purple rim. The ventral side is cream with the same marginal bands and a median brown longitudinal stripe. The pseudotentacles are somewhat pointed formed by folds of the anterior margin. The cerebral cluster of eyes is obscured due to dark pigment of the median line. Ruffle pharynx with elaborated folds.
Internal anatomy: The male apparatus is formed by a large seminal vesicle connected to an uncoiled ejaculatory duct, oval prostatic vesicle and a small stylet housed in a shallow and wide antrum. The female system is characterized by a shallow antrum with a short and muscular vagina surrounded by the cement glands."

Behaviour 
Benthic, diurnals, because of its aposematic colors, it has no fear to crawl around to feed.

Feeding 
Pseudoceros monostichos feeds on various colonial ascidians.

References 

 Leslie Newman & Lester Cannon, "Marine Flatworms",CSIRO publishing,2003,
 Neville Coleman, "Marine life of Maldives",Atoll editions,2004,
 Andrea & Antonnella Ferrrari,"Macrolife",Nautilus publishing,2003,

External links 
 Life Desk, Pseudoceros monostichos 
 Discover Life, Pseudoceros monostichos 
 Turbellarian taxonomic database, Pseudoceros monostichos

Turbellaria
Animals described in 1994